Freetown City Football Club, formerly known as Freetown United, is a Sierra Leonean football club based in Freetown, Sierra Leone. The club is currently playing in the Sierra Leone National First Division, the second highest football league in Sierra Leone. Freetown United was once one of the biggest football club in Sierra Leone during the 1960s and 1970s.

Honours
Sierra Leone National Premier League champions: 1
 1989

Performance in CAF competitions
African Cup of Champions Clubs: 1 appearance
1990: First Round

References

Football clubs in Sierra Leone